Weeton is a hamlet in the East Riding of Yorkshire, England, in an area known as Holderness.

It forms part of the civil parish of Welwick.

References

External links

Villages in the East Riding of Yorkshire
Holderness